Hayden Mountain is located in the Siskiyou Mountains of Klamath County in the U.S. State of Oregon.

See also 
 Applegate Trail
 Hayden Mountain Summit

References 

Mountains of Oregon
Mountains of Klamath County, Oregon